Kit Donovan Pellow (born August 28, 1973) is a former professional baseball player. He has played parts of three seasons in Major League Baseball as a utility player, and also played one season each in the KBO League and the Chinese Professional Baseball League.

Career
Pellow was drafted by the Kansas City Royals in the 60th round of the 1994 Major League Baseball draft, but he did not sign. He played collegiately for Johnson County Community College and the University of Arkansas.

He was drafted by the Royals again in the 22nd round of the 1996 Major League Baseball draft. He signed, and made his Major League Baseball debut on August 14, 2002.

Pellow broke up a no-hit bid by Tom Glavine of the New York Mets in the 8th inning of a game between the Colorado Rockies and New York Mets at Shea Stadium on May 23, 2004.

Pellow last appeared in a major league game during the  season. He has since played for the Saraperos de Saltillo of the Mexican League, Yaquis de Ciudad Obregón in the Mexican Pacific League, and La New Bears of the Chinese Professional Baseball League. In 2008, Pellow hit .385 with 34 home runs and 107 RBIs for the Saraperos and won the Mexican Baseball League Triple Crown. He is only the seventh player in league history to win the triple crown.

In 2010, Pellow split the season between the Broncos de Reynosa in the Mexican League, the Tijuana Cimarrones of the Golden Baseball League, and the Schaumburg Flyers of the Northern League.

References

External links

Career statistics and player information from KBO League

1973 births
Living people
American expatriate baseball players in Canada
American expatriate baseball players in Mexico
American expatriate baseball players in Taiwan
American expatriate baseball players in South Korea
Arkansas Razorbacks baseball players
Asheville Tourists players
Baseball players from Kansas City, Missouri
Broncos de Reynosa players
Calgary Vipers players
Colorado Rockies players
Colorado Springs Sky Sox players
Johnson County Community College people
Kansas City Royals players
KBO League outfielders
La New Bears players
Lansing Lugnuts players
Lincoln Saltdogs players
Lotte Giants players
Major League Baseball catchers
Major League Baseball first basemen
Major League Baseball left fielders
Major League Baseball third basemen
Major League Baseball right fielders
Mexican League baseball first basemen
Mexican League baseball left fielders
Mexican League baseball right fielders
Mexican League baseball third basemen
Mexican League Most Valuable Player Award winners
Omaha Golden Spikes players
Omaha Royals players
Saraperos de Saltillo players
Schaumburg Flyers players
Spokane Indians players
Sultanes de Monterrey players
Tacoma Rainiers players
Tijuana Cimarrones players
Wichita Wranglers players